Ephraim Schröger or Efraim Szreger (1727, in Toruń – 16 August 1783, in Warsaw) was a Polish architect of German origin, active in Poland.

Notable works
New façade for the Carmelite Church, Warsaw
Lelewel Palace
Tepper Palace, Warsaw

References
 Hentschel, Walter: Die sächsische Baukunst des 18. Jahrhunderts in Polen, Berlin 1976, 2 Bände, insbesondere Band 1 (Textband) S. 8off m.w.Nw. und Abbildungen
 Łoza, Stefan: Architekci i budowniczowie w Polsce, Warszawa 1954
 Kwartalnik Architektury i Urbanistyki nr 6, 1961 r., s. 153-60
 Świechowska, A. (Hrsg.):Katedra gnieźnieńska, T. I-II. Poznań 1968-70
 Lorentz, Stanislaw: Efraim Szreger. Architekt polski XVIII wieku, Warszawa 1986 

1727 births
1783 deaths
18th-century German architects
Architects from Warsaw
People from Toruń
Rococo architects